José Eugenio González Pardo (born 7 September 1939) is a Chilean former footballer and manager. He played as a left back.

Honours

Club

Player
Colo-Colo
 Campeonato Nacional (Chile) (3): 1960, 1963
 Copa Chile: 1960

References

External links
 José González at PartidosdeLaRoja 

1939 births
Living people
Footballers from Santiago
Chilean footballers
Chile international footballers
Chilean Primera División players
Colo-Colo footballers
Chilean football managers
Chilean Primera División managers
Colo-Colo managers
Primera B de Chile managers
Unión La Calera managers
Association football defenders